Aleutihenricia is a genus of starfish in the family Echinasteridae in the order Spinulosida.

Species
The following species are recognised by the World Register of Marine Species:

Aleutihenricia beringiana (Djakonov, 1950) 
Aleutihenricia derjungini (Djakonov, 1950) 
Aleutihenricia federi Clark & Jewett, 2010 
Aleutihenricia reticulata (Hayashi, 1940)

References

Echinasteridae